Erika analalava is the only species in the monotypic moth genus Erika of the subfamily Lymantriinae. It is found on Madagascar. Both the genus and the species were first described by Paul Griveaud in 1976.

References

External links
Original description: Griveaud, Paul (1975). "Descriptions préliminaires de nouveaux genres et espèces de Lymantriidae malgaches [Lep.]". Bulletin de la Société entomologique de France . 80 (7-8): 232. 

Lymantriinae